Ulverstone Cricket Club (UCC) is a cricket team which represents Ulverstone  in the North Western Tasmanian Cricket Association grade cricket competition, in the Australian state of Tasmania. The ground that Ulverstone plays at is near Ulverstone Beach.

Honours
NWTCA Premierships:

Australian Players
Ben Hilfenhaus

External links
Ulverstone Cricket Club Website 
 http://www.udcc.com.au

Tasmanian grade cricket clubs
1951 establishments in Australia
Cricket clubs established in 1951
Ulverstone, Tasmania